"Mountain Song" is a song by Jane's Addiction and the second single from their 1988 album Nothing's Shocking.   "Mountain Song" was the first song written by the band in 1985, before a band name had even been decided upon.
The song was initially recorded in 1986 and featured on the soundtrack to the film Dudes, starring Jon Cryer. This version can also be found as a track on the 1997 alternate & live cut compilation album Kettle Whistle. "Mountain Song" was re-recorded in 1988 for Nothing's Shocking.

The single, first released in December 1988, features only the Nothing's Shocking version and not the 1986 original. The b-side "Standing in the Shower... Thinking" is also taken from Nothing's Shocking. The single was re-released on April 18, 2009, to help promote the Jane's Addiction box set A Cabinet of Curiosities, released the same month. The packaging was generally the same but contained several inserts promoting the box set and the band's albums.

"Mountain Song" was named the 71st best hard rock song of all time by VH1.

Music videos
There are two different music videos for this song. The second video, directed by Perry Farrell with live footage directed by Modi Frank, exists in three different versions: the original, the original censored for MTV, and Modi Frank's director's cut. Footage for this video was shot at the Scream in Hollywood on August 19, 1988. Banned from MTV because of nudity, a censored version which puts black bars and shapes over Perry Farrell and Casey Niccoli's genitals was created and MTV agreed to air it on Headbangers Ball and 120 Minutes. As a means to make the official, unedited version available to fans, Jane's Addiction released the "videomentary" Soul Kiss on Valentine's Day 1989. In addition to the "Mountain Song" video, the VHS also features footage of the band performing comedic sketches and footage of the band performing a song called "City" which would not appear on an album until the Kettle Whistle compilation in 1997. Angelo Moore of the band Fishbone can be briefly seen in the video.

The first video for the song was created without the band's knowledge, involvement or input by Andrew Doucette in September 1988 from existing performance footage provided to him by Warner Bros. Records. As the band disliked it, it was shelved and the second video was made. The first video also features some of the footage shot at the Scream. It is this video that was primarily shown in Europe and Australia. Excerpts of the video were included in an episode of Beavis and Butt-Head.

Track listing

In other media
It was briefly used in a Coors commercial before Farrell, led by fan backlash, had it recalled.
It is featured in the movies Dudes and Ken Block's Gymkhana Seven: Wild in the Streets of Los Angeles, the video games Rock Band 2, Guitar Hero World Tour, Saints Row, and Marc Eckō's Getting Up: Contents Under Pressure as well as a Mountain Dew radio commercial from 2005 and the Syfy television show Happy!.
It is covered by Sepultura on their album Revolusongs and by Snapcase on their album Bright Flashes.

References

Jane's Addiction songs
1988 singles
1988 songs
2009 singles
Songs written by Perry Farrell
Songs written by Eric Avery
Warner Records singles